Squared Love is a 2021 Polish romantic comedy film directed by Filip Zylber, written by Wiktor Piątkowski and Marzanna Polit and starring Adrianna Chlebicka, Mateusz Banasiuk and Mirosław Baka. The film is set in Warsaw, Poland, and follows a popular journalist falling in love with a model leading a double life. It was released on 11 February 2021 by Netflix.

Netflix announced in their Q1 2021 investor letter that 31 million households around the world had sampled the movie.

Cast
 Adrianna Chlebicka as Monika Grabarczyk / Klaudia
 Mateusz Banasiuk as Stefan Tkaczyk "Enzo"
 Agnieszka Żulewska as Alicia
 Krzysztof Czeczot as Jacek Szczepański
 Mirosław Baka as Monika's father
 Tomasz Karolak as school principal
 Bartłomiej Kotschedoff as Szymon
 Jacek Knap as Andrzej Tkaczyk
 Anna Smołowik as Ilona Szczepańska 
 Helena Mazur as Ania Tkaczyk
 Sebastian Stankiewicz as Wiesiek
 Jarosław Boberek as director

Reception

References

External links
 
 

2021 films
2021 romantic comedy films
Films about educators
Films about journalists
Films about modeling
Films set in Warsaw
Films shot in Warsaw
Polish-language Netflix original films
Polish romantic comedy films
2020s Polish-language films